"Love You So" is the second single recorded by British singer Delilah, and is sampled from Chaka Khan's Ain't Nobody. The song, produced by Syience, was released as a digital download single on 18 December 2011 in the United Kingdom from her debut album, From the Roots Up.

Music video
A music video to accompany the release of "Love You So" was first released onto YouTube on 29 November 2011 at a total length of three minutes and twenty-seven seconds.

Critical reception
Robert Copsey of Digital Spy gave the song a positive review stating:
Her latest effort sees the 19-year-old carving out her niche a little deeper. Teaming up with Syience, 'Love You So' is another hypnotic offering that locks you in a trance from the off. "You know I left you lonely/ You always leave me with doubt," she confesses over pacey tribal beats with a smoky yet familiar-sounding vocal. The result is a classy pop number that transforms her from an expendable to a force in her own right.

Track listing

Chart performance

Release history

References

2011 singles
Delilah (musician) songs
Songs written by Syience
Warner Music Group singles
Songs written by Delilah (musician)